Sam St. Laurent (born February 16, 1959) is a Canadian former professional ice hockey goaltender who played 34 games in the National Hockey League between 1986 and 1990 as well as on the Canadian national men's hockey team. St. Laurent was last NHL goaltender to wear a mask made entirely out of fiberglass.

Playing career
St. Laurent was born in Arvida, Quebec. As a youth, he played in the 1972 Quebec International Pee-Wee Hockey Tournament with a minor ice hockey team from Arvida. He began his career playing for the Chicoutimi Saguenéens of the QMJHL from the 1975–76 season until the 1978–79 season, playing in 70 games during his final season in the juniors.

On 10 October 1979, St. Laurent signed with the Philadelphia Flyers organization.  From the 1979–80 seasons until the 1983–84 seasons, he spent his time assigned to the minors. St. Laurent played for both the Toledo Goaldiggers of the IHL and the Maine Mariners of the AHL, where he was part of the Calder Cup-winning team during the 1983–84 season.

The Flyers traded St. Laurent to the New Jersey Devils on 27 September 1984 for future considerations. For the 1984–85 season, he remained with the Mariners of the AHL.

The 1985–86 season was one of many accomplishments for St. Laurent. His first NHL game was on 4 January 1986, where he replaced (and was subsequently replaced by) Glenn "Chico" Resch in a stunning 9–3 loss to the Washington Capitals. After a brief reassignment to the minors, St. Laurent was called back up and started his first NHL game 27 March 1986, making 24 saves to earn a 1–0 shutout victory. He went on to post a 2–1 record with the Devils that season.  On a minor league level, he won the Aldege "Baz" Bastien Memorial Award for the AHL's best goaltender and shared the Harry "Hap" Holmes Memorial Award with Karl Friesen for having the lowest team GAA in the AHL.

The Detroit Red Wings acquired St. Laurent from New Jersey for Steve Richmond on 18 August 1986. St. Laurent enjoyed a particular level of success with their minor league affiliate Adirondack Red Wings of the AHL, winning the Calder Cup with them during the 1988–89 season, as well as receiving the Jack A. Butterfield Trophy for the MVP during the Calder Cup playoffs that same year. From the 1986–87 season to the 1989–90 season, St. Laurent posted a cumulative 5–11–4 record with 3.42 GAA and a .887 save percentage in 30 regular season appearances with the Detroit Red Wings. He appeared in a playoff game on 14 April 1988, where he was injured after allowing one goal in what eventually became a 5–3 Red Wings victory over the Toronto Maple Leafs (Greg Stefan finished the game in St. Laurent's place.)

With the emergence of Tim Cheveldae from the Red Wings' depth chart, St. Laurent was traded to the New York Rangers for cash on 26 June 1990.  For the 1990–91 season, St. Laurent spent his time with the Binghamton Rangers of the AHL. During the 1991–92 season, his last as a professional, he appeared in one game for the Binghamton Rangers, and was the third-string goaltender for the silver medal winning Canadian national team at the 1992 Winter Olympics

After playing his entire career wearing a fibreglass mask, he finally donned a modern mask as a member of the Canadian Olympic team, then retired.

Coaching career 
St. Laurent went on to become a goaltender coach/consultant for the Rangers organization from 1993–2004, helping the organization develop such goalies as Mike Richter, Henrik Lundqvist, and Dan Cloutier. Jason Labarbera, who began his career as a member of the Rangers organization, credits St. Laurent for his development in the Rangers organization despite the presence of highly regarded goaltender coach Benoit Allaire. He was also a consultant for the Sinupret Ice Tigers of the German Deutsche Eishockey Liga for the 2005–06 season.

Career statistics

Regular season and playoffs

References

External links
 
 Sam St. Laurent @ hockeygoalies.org

1959 births
Living people
Adirondack Red Wings players
Binghamton Rangers players
Canadian ice hockey goaltenders
Chicoutimi Saguenéens (QMJHL) players
Detroit Red Wings players
Ice hockey people from Quebec
Maine Mariners players
New Jersey Devils players
Sportspeople from Saguenay, Quebec
Toledo Goaldiggers players
Undrafted National Hockey League players